The Guinean conger (Paraconger notialis) is an eel in the family Congridae (conger/garden eels). It was described by Robert H. Kanazawa in 1961. It is a tropical, marine eel which is known from Senegal to Angola, in the eastern Atlantic Ocean. It dwells at a depth range of 25–50 metres, and inhabits benthic sand, which it burrows into backwards. Males can reach a maximum total length of 62.7 centimetres.

References

Congridae
Taxa named by Robert H. Kanazawa
Fish described in 1961